SS Cotton Mather was a Liberty ship built in the United States during World War II. She was named after Cotton Mather, a New England Puritan minister, prolific author, and pamphleteer.

Construction
Cotton Mather was laid down on 28 September 1942, under a Maritime Commission (MARCOM) contract, MCE hull 922, by the Bethlehem-Fairfield Shipyard, Baltimore, Maryland; she was sponsored by Mrs .R.M. Meyers, the wife of a yard employee, and was launched on 31 October 1942.

History
She was allocated to American Export Lines Inc., on 30 November 1942. On 22 May 1950, she was laid up in the National Defense Reserve Fleet, Wilmington, North Carolina. On 24 November 1959, she was sold for scrapping to Walsh Construction Co., for $71,825. She was removed from the fleet on 9 February 1960.

References

Bibliography

 
 
 
 

 

Liberty ships
Ships built in Baltimore
1942 ships
Wilmington Reserve Fleet